Annemiek van Vleuten (born 8 October 1982) is a Dutch professional road racing cyclist, who rides for UCI Women's WorldTeam .

Van Vleuten is a two-time winner of both the road race (2019 and 2022) and the time trial (2017 and 2018) at the UCI Road World Championships. In the Olympic Games, she crashed out of the lead of the road race in 2016, before winning the gold medal at the time trial event and a silver in the road race at the COVID-19 pandemic-delayed 2020 Olympics. She won the Dutch National Road Race Championships in 2012, and won the Dutch National Time Trial Championships four times between 2014 and 2019.

Van Vleuten has won both of women's cycling Grand Tours – winning the Giro d'Italia Donne three times in 2018, 2019 and 2022, and winning the inaugural Tour de France Femmes in 2022. She became the first woman to complete a Giro–Tour double in the same year.

In winning the UCI Women's Road World Cup in 2011, and the UCI Women's World Tour in 2018, 2021 and 2022, Van Vleuten won multiple stage races and one day events. She has won cycling monuments including Liège–Bastogne–Liège Femmes, Strade Bianche Donne and Tour of Flanders for Women on multiple occasions. She has been awarded Dutch women's cyclist of the year three times. Van Vleuten will retire at the end of the 2023 season.

Career
As a child, Van Vleuten played football, gymnastics and horse riding – and rode her bike to school. Van Vleuten studied animal sciences and specialised in zoonoses and epidemiology at the University of Wageningen, graduating with a master's degree in epidemiology in 2007. In 2005, she was advised by her doctor to take up cycling following a knee injury playing football.

Early career 
Starting her cycling career at amateur teams in 2007 aged 25, Van Vleuten joined the Dutch  team in 2009. Quitting her office job in 2010 to become a full time professional cyclist, her first major win was at the 2010 Novilon Eurocup Ronde van Drenthe. She then won La Route de France later that year. In 2011, she won the UCI Women's Road World Cup, winning key races like Tour of Flanders for Women, GP de Plouay – Bretagne and Open de Suède Vårgårda.

In 2012, Van Vleuten represented the Netherlands in the Women's road race at the 2012 Summer Olympics, along with Ellen van Dijk, Marianne Vos and Loes Gunnewijk. The race was won by Vos. She also won the Dutch National Road Race Championships. After a less than successful 2013, she won the Dutch National Time Trial Championships for the first time in 2014. She took part in the 2015 European Games for the Netherlands, in cycling; Van Vleuten won a bronze medal in the time trial, and finished seventh in the road race.

Orica–AIS (2016–20)
In 2016, Van Vleuten joined the  team. On 7 August 2016, while leading the road race at the Olympic Games, Van Vleuten crashed head first on the steep descent from Vista Chinesa after missing her braking point before a sharp bend,  before the finish. The crash knocked her unconscious, and she was hospitalised with three lumbar spinal fractures and a severe concussion. Despite her injuries, Van Vleuten was riding a bicycle within ten days of her accident and made a winning return to competition one month later, taking the overall victory and two stage wins at the Belgium Tour. Earlier in the season, she had also won her second Dutch National Time Trial Championships.

2017–19: World Championships, Giro Rosa victories
In 2017, she became world champion for the first time, winning the time trial event in Bergen, Norway. She also won the Holland Ladies Tour, La Course by Le Tour de France, and retained her national Time Trial Championship.

2018 was Van Vleuten's most successful year of her career – she won the Giro Rosa (winning 3 stages), she defended her world title in the time trial at the 2018 UCI Road World Championships in Innsbruck, Austria, and she won the UCI Women's World Tour after multiple victories at events such as La Course by Le Tour de France and the Holland Ladies Tour. She ended the 2018 season with a total of 13 victories.

In 2019, Van Vleuten defended her Giro Rosa title, winning by over 3 minutes and taking all the major classifications (general, points and mountain). She also won the Dutch national time trial championship for the fourth time. Despite winning the Giro Rosa and major races such as Liège–Bastogne–Liège and Strade Bianche, Van Vleuten finished second in the UCI Women's World Tour standings behind fellow Dutch rider Marianne Vos.

In the COVID-19 pandemic-disrupted 2020 season, she won the road race at the European Road Championships, as well as Strade Bianche for the second time.

Movistar Team (2021–present)

2021: Olympic Games medals
She started her season by winning Tour of Flanders for Women, 10 years after her first victory.

In July, she was one of four Dutch cyclists competing in the  women's Olympic road race in Tokyo, where she won the silver medal in the race, crossing the finish line 75 seconds behind Austria's Anna Kiesenhofer. With around  left in the race, Van Vleuten crashed, but rejoined the race. When Van Vleuten finished the race, she celebrated thinking she had won, as she was unaware of Kiesenhofer being in front of her. Three days later, she became Olympic champion by winning the gold medal in the time trial.

She won the UCI Women's World Tour for the second time, following victories at the Challenge by La Vuelta and Ladies Tour of Norway. In October, she crashed in the first ever Paris–Roubaix Femmes, breaking her pubis bone in two places, ending her season. In December, Van Vleuten was named Dutch cyclist of the year for a third time, having previously won the award in 2017 and 2019.

2022: Giro–Tour–Vuelta triple, second world road race title
In 2022, Van Vleuten started her season by winning two classics – Omloop Het Nieuwsblad, and the Liège–Bastogne–Liège Femmes for the second time. She won her third Giro d'Italia Donne the following month, winning two stages and the points classification.

Later the same month, she was named as one of the pre-race favourites for the inaugural edition of the Tour de France Femmes. During the race, she suffered from stomach issues early on, which had left her more than a minute behind race leader Marianne Vos after three stages. Having moved up to eighth overall following the sixth stage, Van Vleuten split the race apart on the penultimate stage; having attacked on the first climb of the day, the Col du Petit Ballon, only Demi Vollering was able to keep pace with Van Vleuten. Before the top of the next climb, the Col du Platzerwasel, Van Vleuten was on her own, having accelerated clear of Vollering. Van Vleuten remained clear for the remaining  and ultimately won the stage by over three minutes, moving into the race lead.On stage 7 she blew the race apart with a solo attack for the stage win, which also put her in the yellow jersey as overall race leader by over 3 minutes ahead of Demi Vollering. The next day she cemented her victory, extending her lead in the process; she attacked with  remaining, passed the remaining breakaway riders, and soloed to win by 30 seconds ahead of Vollering. In the general classification, Van Vleuten won by nearly four minutes from Vollering, with only five other riders within ten minutes. She became the first woman to complete a Giro–Tour double in the same year.

In September, she won the Challenge by La Vuelta, as well as winning the second stage, in doing so she completed a Giro–Tour–Vuelta triple, a feat never managed by a male cyclist. The following week, Van Vleuten recorded her worst result in the time trial at the UCI Road World Championships in Wollongong, finishing in seventh place – a result she described as a "shit day". Three days later, in the mixed team relay, Van Vleuten crashed shortly after leaving the start, which resulted in a fractured elbow and made her a doubt for the road race three days later. Van Vleuten ultimately took the start of the race, initially riding as a domestique for Marianne Vos. By the end, Van Vleuten capitalised on a late-race stalling of pace, attacking with around  remaining, holding off around a dozen riders by a second to take the rainbow jersey. In doing so, Van Vleuten became the first female rider to win the Triple Crown of Cycling.

Personal life
Outside of cycling, Van Vleuten lives a low-key life, enjoying scuba diving, watching football, and playing the Settlers of Catan board game with friends.

Career achievements

See also
 List of Dutch Olympic cyclists

References

External links

1982 births
Cyclists at the 2012 Summer Olympics
Cyclists at the 2015 European Games
Cyclists at the 2016 Summer Olympics
Cyclists at the 2020 Summer Olympics
Dutch Tour de France Femme stage winners
Dutch cycling time trial champions
Dutch epidemiologists
Dutch female cyclists
Dutch track cyclists
European Games bronze medalists for the Netherlands
European Games medalists in cycling
Living people
Medalists at the 2020 Summer Olympics
Olympic cyclists of the Netherlands
Olympic gold medalists for the Netherlands
Olympic medalists in cycling
Olympic silver medalists for the Netherlands
Road racing cyclists
Sportspeople from Utrecht (city)
UCI Road World Champions (women)
UCI Road World Championships cyclists for the Netherlands
Cyclists from Utrecht (province)
Women epidemiologists